Samuel Charlheins Reimas (born 19 September 1992) is an Indonesian professional footballer who plays as a goalkeeper for Liga 2 club Semen Padang.

Club career

Perseru Serui
On 22 January 2018, Perseru signed Reimas from newly promoted club, Persebaya. Reimas had 25 appearances with Perseru in 2018 season and recorded 10 clean sheets. He had a saves record in 2018 with 84, tied with Wawan Hendrawan and only lost to Teja Paku Alam.

Bali United
On 13 January 2019, Reimas officially signed a two-year contract with Bali United. He made his debut on 8 December 2019 in a match against Persipura Jayapura at the Kapten I Wayan Dipta Stadium, Gianyar.

Semen Padang
Reimas was signed for Semen Padang to play in Liga 2 in the 2022–23 season. He made his league debut on 29 August 2022 in a match against PSPS Riau at the Riau Main Stadium, Riau.

Honours

Club
Bali United
 Liga 1: 2019, 2021–22

References

External links
 Samuel Reimas at Soccerway
 Samuel Reimas at Liga Indonesia

1992 births
Living people
Indonesian footballers
Liga 1 (Indonesia)
Persebaya Surabaya players
Perseru Serui players
Bali United F.C. players
Association football goalkeepers
People from Sorong